Riverdance: Music from the Show is an album of the music composed by Bill Whelan for the Riverdance theatrical show, and performed by the show's own musicians and singers.

Background
The recording was engineered and mixed at Windmill Lane Studios in 1995. In 1997, it won the Grammy Award for Best Musical Show Album for 1996. The album was released five times: in 1995, 1997, 2003, 2005 and 2020, each time with a different cover, sometimes different versions or mixes of the songs, and a slightly different track list. Notably, the "Cloudsong" and "Riverdance" segments are placed under one track going by the name of the latter.

Track listing
Track listing from the original release in 1995:

"Reel Around the Sun" (Bill Whelan) – 8:40
"The Heart's Cry" (Bill Whelan) – 2:26
"The Countess Cathleen/Women of the Sidhe" (Bill Whelan) – 5:42
"Firedance" (Bill Whelan) – 6:02
"Caoineadh Cú Chulainn" (Lament) (Bill Whelan) – 4:09
"Slip into Spring" (Bill Whelan) – 3:44
"Riverdance" (Bill Whelan) – 5:42
"Lift the Wings" (Bill Whelan) – 4:58
"Freedom" (Bill Whelan) – 3:40
"Andalucía" (Bill Whelan) – 4:19
"Macedonian Morning" (Bill Whelan) – 2:56
"Marta's Dance"/"The Russian Dervish" (Bill Whelan) – 6:03
"Hope To The Suffering" (Bill Whelan) – 4:52

Re-releases
The album was re-released four times, with a different cover and a slightly different track list each time.

1997 release

Track listing from the second release, in 1997:

"Reel Around the Sun" (Bill Whelan) – 8:40
"The Heart's Cry" (Bill Whelan) – 2:26
"The Countess Cathleen/Women of the Sidhe" (Bill Whelan) – 5:42
"Caoineadh Cú Chulainn" (Lament) (Bill Whelan) – 4:09
"Shivna" (Bill Whelan) – 3:38
"Firedance" (Bill Whelan) – 6:02
"Slip into Spring" (Bill Whelan) – 3:44
"Riverdance" (Bill Whelan) – 5:42
"American Wake" (The Nova Scotia Set) (Bill Whelan) – 3:07
"Lift the Wings" (Bill Whelan) – 4:58
"Macedonian Morning" (Bill Whelan) – 2:56
"Marta's Dance"/"The Russian Dervish" (Bill Whelan) – 6:03
"Andalucía" (Bill Whelan) – 4:19
"Home and the Heartland" (Bill Whelan) – 3:25
"The Harvest" (Bill Whelan) – 3:38
"Riverdance" (Reprise) (Bill Whelan) – 3:47

2003 release

Track listing from the third release, in 2003, which was the Japanese version and included two bonus tracks:

"Reel Around the Sun" (Bill Whelan) – 8:40
"The Heart's Cry" (Bill Whelan) – 2:26
"The Countess Cathleen/Women of the Sidhe" (Bill Whelan) – 5:42
"Caoineadh Cú Chulainn" (Lament) (Bill Whelan) – 4:09
"Shivna" (Bill Whelan) – 3:38
"Firedance" (Bill Whelan) – 6:02
"Slip into Spring" (Bill Whelan) – 3:44
"Riverdance" (Bill Whelan) – 5:42
"American Wake" (The Nova Scotia Set) (Bill Whelan) – 3:07
"Lift the Wings" (Bill Whelan) – 4:58
"Macedonian Morning" (Bill Whelan) – 2:56
"Marta's Dance"/"The Russian Dervish" (Bill Whelan) – 6:03
"Andalucía" (Bill Whelan) – 4:19
"Home and the Heartland" (Bill Whelan) – 3:25
"The Harvest" (Bill Whelan) – 3:38
"Riverdance" (Reprise) (Bill Whelan) – 3:47
"I Will Set You Free" (Bill Whelan) – 3:45
"Endless Journey" (Bill Whelan) – 4:42

2005 release

Track listing from the fourth release, in 2005, labelled as "10th Anniversary Edition, with newly recorded music":

"Reel Around the Sun" (Bill Whelan) – 8:42
"The Heart's Cry" (Bill Whelan) – 2:26
"The Countess Cathleen/Women of the Sidhe" (Bill Whelan) – 5:44
"Caoineadh Cú Chulainn" (Lament) (Bill Whelan) – 4:11
"Shivna" (Bill Whelan) – 4:05
"Firedance" (Bill Whelan) – 6:04
"Slip into Spring"/"The Harvest" (Bill Whelan) – 5:01
"Riverdance" (Bill Whelan) – 5:45
"American Wake" (The Nova Scotia Set) (Bill Whelan) – 3:07
"Lift the Wings" (Bill Whelan) – 3:00
"Heal Their Hearts"/"Freedom" (Bill Whelan) – 6:26
"Macedonian Morning" (Bill Whelan) – 2:56
"Marta's Dance"/"The Russian Dervish" (Bill Whelan) – 6:04
"Andalucía" (Bill Whelan) – 4:22
"Riverdance" (Reprise) (Bill Whelan) – 4:32

Personnel
The recording included the following performers and production team:

Musicians
Cormac Breatnach – tin whistle
Máire Breatnach – fiddle
Ronan Browne – uilleann pipes
Robbie Casserly – bass, drums
Áine Uí Cheallaigh – vocals
Anthony Drennan – guitar
Noel Eccles – percussion
Kenneth Edge – soprano sax
Juan Reina Gonzalez – cantor
Robbie Harris – bodhrán
David Hayes – keyboards
Tom Hayes – bodhrán, spoons
Eileen Ivers – fiddle
Declan Masterson – low whistle
Michael McGlynn – conductor
Des Moore – acoustic guitar
Máirtín O'Connor – accordion
Prionsias O'Duinn – conductor
Eoghan O'Neill – bass guitar
Nikola Parov – gadulka, kaval
Desi Reynolds – drums, tom-tom
Rafael Riqueni – guitar
Davy Spillane – uilleann pipes, tin whistle

Singers
Anúna
Brian Dunphy
Lynn Hilary
Michael Samuels
The Riverdance Singers

Irish dancers
Jean Butler (tracks 3 and 16) 
Michael Flatley (tracks 1, 3 and 16)
Riverdance Irish Dance Troupe (tracks 1, 3 and 16)

Production
Andrew Boland – engineer, mixing, remixing  
Ciaran Cahill – assistant engineer  
Conan Doyle – assistant engineer  
Nick Ingman – orchestration  
Rob Kirwan – assistant engineer  
Bob Ludwig – mastering  
Willie Mannion – assistant engineer  
Conal Markey – assistant engineer  
Alastair McMillian – assistant engineer  
Bill Whelan – arranger, composer, orchestration, producer, remixing

Charts

Certifications

References

External links
Official website

1993 compositions
Eurovision Song Contest 1994
1995 albums
Albums by Irish artists
Atlantic Records albums
Decca Records albums
Universal Music Group albums